Fate is a city located in the center of Rockwall County, Texas.   The population in 2020 was 17,958 up from 6,357 in 2010, and 602 in 2000.

History 
According to tradition, the city was named after Lafayette "Fate" Brown, a pioneer settler. However, the unique name of the town is derived from a nickname of one of two residents, either William Lafayette Brown or GW Lafayette Peyton. Which former resident named the City has been debated for years. According to a 1976 City document, "there is considerable agreement that the town was named for William Lafayette Brown." However, there are no absolute evident records for verification of the inception of the town’s name. Therefore, it will never be known for sure. What Is known, is that there were two influential gentlemen nicknamed “Fate” who lived in the area during the 1860s. Three important aspects of life played a role in the naming of the City, land ownership, a post office, and the railroad. Since the town was small, it is likely that both the Brown and Peyton families were common relatives with Fate’s first postmaster Harvey Peyton White and could have been named after either or both men.

Geography 
Downtown Fate is 4.8 miles to the east of downtown Rockwall on Texas State Highway 66. FM 551 is the most northern road that is just north of I-30. Downtown Royse City is 4.5 miles to the northeast.

Demographics 

As of the 2020 United States census, there were 17,958 people, 4,552 households, and 3,895 families residing in the city. The age distribution was 33.6% under the age of 18 and 7.8% who were 65 years of age or older. The percentage of women was 52.1% across the city. Persons age 25 or older who graduated high school was 95.8%, with 44.6% of those adults holding a bachelor's degree or higher.

Education 

Fate is served by the Rockwall Independent School District in the southern and western portions of the city and the Royse City Independent School District in the northern and eastern portions.  Royse City ISD provides three campuses in Fate; Miss May Vernon Elementary School, Harry H Herndon Elementary School and Bobby Summers Middle School.

The Rockwall ISD has two elementary campuses. Billie Stevenson Elementary School, which opened at the start of the 2013–2014 school year and is located in the city's Woodcreek subdivision. As well as, Lupe Garcia Elementary, which opened at the start of the 2021–2022 school year and is located in the Williamsburg subdivision.

Site of remarriage of Lee Harvey Oswald's widow
The town made national news in 1965 when Marina Oswald, the widow of accused presidential assassin Lee Harvey Oswald, remarried a little more than 18 months after her husband's slaying.  Electronics worker Kenneth Porter and she worked at eluding reporters, who had learned of the engagement, and traveled to Fate to be wed by Carl Leonard Jr., a justice of the peace.

Notable people 

 Ralph Hall, former member of the US House of Representatives was born here
 Robert Smith III, Rear Admiral; Former Senior VP of Federal Reserve Bank and Rear (two-star) Admiral in the US Navy

Notes

References

External links 
 City of Fate's website

Dallas–Fort Worth metroplex
Cities in Texas
Cities in Rockwall County, Texas